The San Francisco Improv Alliance is a group of actors dedicated to improvisational theater. It was started in 2005 by Shaun Landry, artistic director of Oui Be Negroes. The Alliance offers master class workshops and national ensembles, co-production of pre-established ensembles, performance opportunities for upcoming ensembles, staging of self-produced shows, and community outreach in the field of improvisational theatre.

The San Francisco Improv Talent Pool also offers improvisational actors a chance at paying work in the craft of improvisational theater through educational, corporate, film, radio and television events.

In 2007 the Alliance expanded its community resources to improvisers within San Francisco, CA. They provided improvisors for The San Francisco Family Festival and Public Service Announcements for The Department of Public Health. The Alliance also booked improvisors for Major League Baseball.

The Improv Alliance also produces The San Francisco Improv Festival. Beginning in 2003 (with improviser Sam Shaw), the SFIF has had thousands of audience members attend improvisational theater and learn from master class teachers including Mick Napier, David Razowsky, and Ian Roberts. It is one of the few improvisational Theater Festivals that pays its ensembles to perform. Starting as a 12-week event, The festival now runs over a seven-week span, making it still "The Longest Running Improv Festival in the Country".

Sam Shaw left the San Francisco Improv Festival in June 2005 giving all rights and entities to the business of The San Francisco Improv Festival (SFIF) to Landry.  In 2007, Clay Robeson and Hans Summers are now Associate Producers along with Ms. Landry.

Timeline

2008

July 2: The Best of The San Francisco Improv Festival at SFTF 2008
July–August: The San Francisco Improv Festival
June 29-29: SFIA’s Irish Mutts performs at The Twin Cities Improv Festival
June 2–8: SFIA's Irish Mutts performs at The Chicago Improv Festival
April 18–20: SFIA’s Irish Mutts at The Oberlin College Improv Conference
March 16: SFIA Produces PowerDesigner Webisode
March 6–16: SFIA Produces Toss of a Hat as part of the BOA Festival
February: The SFIA Becomes Casting Partners with Creative I Talent
February: Landry and Summers Performs at Boxcar Theater
February: Oui Be Negroes performs with SacActors.com Sacramento
January-Feb: SFIA Produces Webisodes for Mobile Complete
January 19: Storytellers Unplugged at ETH-NO-TECH
January 12: Hosting Onion’s Broken Resolutions at Mighty
January 10: Storytellers Unplugged performs at O’Connell High School.

2007

December 5, 2007: The SFIA Talent Pool at Bacardi/Dewers Repeal Day Celebration
November 16, 2007: The Irish Mutts performs at IO West Los Angeles.
November 2–17: The Alliance produces Improv and Soul Revue at The Darkroom Theater
October 20 - An Evening with Landry and Bodden at The Actors’ Theater Santa Cruz
October 13: The Alliance hosts Gavin Newsom’s San Francisco Family Festival
July 29 - The SFIA goes to The Santa Cruz Improv Festival - An Evening with Landry and Bodden
July: The Alliance Talent Pool at Major League Baseball’s Fanfest
June–July: The San Francisco Improv Festival 2007
June 5–6: The Alliance performs for Linksys
May: The Alliance and Shaun Landry on KQED Cool As Hell Podcast
May 2007: The Alliance helps cast Late Night with Conan O'Brien
April 21–28: The Alliance produces Improv Juggernaut Comedy at The Exit
April 21–22: The Alliance Produces SPF7 We Used to Fuck
March: The Alliance takes permanent residence at The Garage Theater
February 2007: Oui Be Negroes Performs at the Climate Theater
January 2007: The Alliance takes over the Monday Night Make Em Ups

2006

December 2006: The Alliance Performs for Hart Howerton
September 2006 The Improv Alliance Presents Unfiltered Comedy
August 31 - September 2, 2006 The Improv Alliance Presents Revolving Madness and SPF7
August 27, 2006: John Filgas Memorial
June 26, 2006: Jill Bernard Drop In Class
June 15 - July 27, 2006: The San Francisco Improv Festival
April 8, 2006: The Alliance Hosts iTalent HP Photo Shoot Audition
March 18–19, 2006: The Alliance Hosts Commercial Improv Auditions for RMITV
March 17- April 8, 2006: The Improv Alliance Presents Revolving Madness
March 3–11, 2006: The Improv Alliance Presents Drunken Monkey
February 22, 2006: The Improv Alliance appears on a Mytechnologylawyer.com webcast
January 19, 20, 21, 26-27 2006: The Improv Alliance Presents 15-Minutes
February 13–18, 2006: The Improv Alliance Talent Pool Performs for Vodavi Communications Systems
January 11, 18, & 25 2006: The Improv Alliance Presents The Audition Class
January 5, 2006: The Improv Alliance Talent Pool Performs for McGraw Hill

2005

December: The Alliance Presents The Practice Round: Pay what you can Classes
December 9: The Alliance performs for Texaco/Chevron Holiday Celebration
November: Alliance featured in Theater Bay Area
October 19: Alliance Talent Pool Performs for Dome Construction Oktoberfest
October 15: Improv Alliance Oui Be Negroes performs at Denver Improv Fest
October 7: Improv Alliance First Talent Pool Performance for Family Caregivers
October 4: Improv Alliance and the Flood Relief Improv Revue
September: The Alliance Helps Manage the Climate Theater
August 27: The San Francisco Improv Alliance Historical Group Photo 2005
August 5–27: Improv Alliance/OBN - Cafe Negro at The Climate Theatre
July 30: Alliance and Oui Be Negroes on Cool as Hell Podcast San Francisco
July 12: Improv Alliance Drop in Classes at the Darkroom
June–July: Improv Alliance Forms The Improv Talent Pool
May 28: Alliance Announces Submissions for SF Improv Festival 2006
May 26: Oui Be Negroes Becomes House Ensemble with the Alliance
May 23: Improv Alliance Forms. First Alliance email newsletter distributed

See also
 Improvisational theatre
 List of improvisational theatre companies

External links 
 The San Francisco Improv Alliance
 The San Francisco Improv Festival
 The Alliance on Youtube
 The Alliance Flickr Page
 The Alliance on MySpace

Improvisational theatre